Fernando Chemin Radaelli (born 9 June 1982 in Dourados) is a Brazilian footballer who last played for NK Međimurje in Croatia.

References

1982 births
Living people
Brazilian footballers
Association football defenders
People from Dourados
Sportspeople from Mato Grosso do Sul